Angela Merkel (born 1954) is a German former politician who served as the Chancellor of Germany from 2005 to 2021.

Merkel may also refer to:
 Merkel (surname)
 Merkel (firearms manufacturer)
 Merkel, Texas, United States

See also 
 Flying Merkel, motorcycle by the American company Merkel
 Merkel cells in the skin
 Merkel cell cancer, a rare type of cancer
 Merkel nerve endings, a type of slowly adapting mechanoreceptor in the skin
 Merkel-Raute, a hand gesture associated with Angela Merkel
 Merkle (disambiguation)